Lindholmiola reischuetzi is a species of air-breathing land snail, a terrestrial pulmonate gastropod mollusc in the family Helicodontidae.

Geographic distribution 
This species is endemic to Greece, where it occurs on the island of Thasos and in the northern part of the country's mainland.

See also
List of non-marine molluscs of Greece

References

Further reading

Lindholmiola
Molluscs of Europe
Endemic fauna of Greece
Gastropods described in 1995